Orthotrichum crassifolium is a species of moss in the family Orthotrichaceae.  It is sometimes placed in the genus Muelleriella.  It has a wide circumpolar distribution on subantarctic islands through the Southern Ocean, as well as the extreme south of South America and the northern end of the Antarctic Peninsula.  It is tolerant of saline conditions and often occupies the supralittoral zone along rocky coastlines affected by sea spray.

References

Further reading
 Seppelt, Rod. (2006). The Moss Flora of Macquarie Island. Australian Antarctic Division: Hobart. 

Orthotrichales
Flora of the Antarctic
Flora of the Antipodes Islands
Flora of the Campbell Islands
Flora of southern Chile
Flora of South Argentina
Snares Islands / Tini Heke
Plants described in 1844